Aughton is a civil parish in the West Lancashire district of Lancashire, England.  It contains 15 buildings that are recorded in the National Heritage List for England as designated listed buildings.  Of these, one is listed at Grade I, the highest of the three grades, one is at Grade II*, the middle grade, and the others are at Grade II, the lowest grade.  The parish is partly residential, and partly rural.  The listed buildings consist of churches, houses, farmhouses and farm buildings, two cross bases, boundary stones, and a war memorial.


Key

Buildings

References

Citations

Sources

Lists of listed buildings in Lancashire
Buildings and structures in the Borough of West Lancashire